Labatt Memorial Park (formerly Tecumseh Park, 1877–1936) is a baseball stadium near the forks of the Thames River in central London, Ontario, Canada. The park is currently home to the London Majors of the Intercounty Baseball League and the Western Mustangs

Labatt Park is the "oldest continually operating baseball grounds in the world", with a history dating back to 1877. Since December 31, 1936, Labatt Park has been owned by the City of London.

On September 7, 2011, Baseball Canada announced that historic Labatt Memorial Park in London, Ontario, had won its six-week-long, favourite ballpark contest, winning the final round where it went head-to-head with Port Arthur Stadium in Thunder Bay, Ontario. During the two-week-long, final round of online voting, where more than 19,000 votes were cast, Labatt Park won with 63 per cent of the vote.

However, Fuller Field in Clinton, Massachusetts made it into the Guinness Book of World Records in September 2007 as the "world's oldest continually used baseball diamond/ field", dating back to 1878—a year after Tecumseh Park-Labatt Park opened in 1877—as Fuller Field's home plate and bases have purportedly remained in the same location since 1878, whereas home plate at Labatt Park has been moved (within the same field) from its original location in 1877.

In September 2008, however, Labatt Park replaced Clinton, Massachusetts' Fuller Field in the 2009 Guinness Book of World Records (page 191) as the "World's Oldest Baseball Diamond." Although it has flip flopped in the past, as of January 4, 2016, Guinness's online record for the World's Oldest Baseball Field/Diamond now states Labatt Park, London, Ontario. World's Oldest Baseball Field

On May 30, 1994, the park was designated by London City Council under Part IV of the Ontario Heritage Act as an historic site via by-Law No. L.S.P.-3237-544, with the ceremonial plaque unveiling at the front gates of the park occurring on July 1 (Canada Day), 1994, prior to a doubleheader between the London Majors and Toronto Maple Leafs of the Intercounty Baseball League.

The park's designation occurred after a six-month-long lobbying effort spearheaded by the volunteer, non-profit organization, The Friends of Labatt Park, which has undertaken a number of initiatives during the past 24 years to enhance and promote the ballpark, its history and ambience.

Commons area at the riverforks

According to Seneca College's Professor Bill Humber, a noted Canadian baseball historian and author, the site of today's Labatt Park was likely used for recreational games when it was a grassy commons area at the riverforks, prior to becoming Tecumseh Park in 1877.

Baseball's roots are in the immediate area around London.  The game of baseball, a derivative of the British game of rounders, had probably arrived in the area from nearby Beachville, Ontario, where the world's first recorded baseball game was played in 1838. (See Baseball Before We Knew It and Origins of baseball for other possible origins).

London Tecumsehs

The founding of the London Tecumsehs Baseball Club in 1868 ultimately led to the creation of Tecumseh Park in 1877. According to the London Advertiser of May 4, 1877, the first game at the new baseball park was held on May 3, 1877, with a contest between the London Tecumsehs and its junior team, the London Atlantics. The Tecumsehs won 5-1.

To wit: "The first regular game of baseball of the season was played yesterday afternoon in the presence of fully a thousand people. The new grounds are the most complete of every respect of  any of the kind in Canada, and but few American cities have a convenient playing field."

On May 4, 1877, the Tecumsehs met the Hartfords of Brooklyn in their first International league game. Phil Powers, the Tecumsehs' star catcher, was out with a broken finger. The London nine were defeated 6-2.

On May 24, 1877, before 8,000 fans, the National League champion Boston Red Stockings played the London Tecumsehs of the fledgling International Association.  With its star pitcher and later Chicago White Stocking stalwart, Fred Goldsmith. Boston narrowly defeated London, 7-6.

Created by London china merchant W. J. Reid, Tecumseh Park was named after the Shawnee Chief Tecumseh who fought alongside the British during the War of 1812 and who died in the Battle of the Thames near Chatham, Ontario, in October 1813.

Jacob Englehart, the Cleveland-born oil tycoon, a future vice president of Imperial Oil and the Tecumseh's president/principal owner, moved the team to Tecumseh Park in 1877.

Englehart soon began looking for professional players from the U.S., later signing four Americans:

 first-baseman/manager George "Juice" Latham
 pitcher Fred Goldsmith of New Haven, Connecticut (believed by many to be the co-inventor of the curveball along with Candy Cummings of Ware, Massachusetts)
 catcher Phil Powers and
 infielder/outfielder Joe Hornung (nicknamed "Dutchy" and "Ubbo Ubbo") from Carthage, New York.

Goldsmith's first complete game with the Tecumsehs occurred on May 24, 1876, when London played Guelph Maple Leafs before 6,000 spectators at the old Fair Grounds (southeast corner of Wellington and Pall Mall streets in London), a contest that London won 8-7 in 10 innings, largely due to Goldsmith's "scientific pitching", using his innovative "skew ball."

After the Tecumsehs, Goldsmith went on to pitch for the Troy, New York Trojans in 1879, National League's Chicago White Stockings from 1880 to 1884 and the American Association's Baltimore Orioles, also in 1884.

In addition to Englehart, the Tecumsehs' back-room movers and shakers consisted of London newspaperman Harry Gorman; Ed Moore, manager of the Tecumseh House; Richard Meredith, a future chief justice of the Supreme Court of Ontario; William Southam, who was to found Southam News and to add an egalitarian touch, Jim Jury, a custodian at the collegiate institute.

The following year in 1877, the Tecumsehs played in the International Association, a rival of the National League. That year, the Tecumsehs defeated the National League's Boston Red Stockings in an exhibition game at Tecumseh Park and later in the season they defeated the Pittsburgh Allegheny 5-2 to win the International Association pennant. More than 6,000 people attended London's pennant-winning game in a park built to seat 600.

After the season, the Tecumsehs were offered membership in the National League, but declined. The Tecusmsehs subsequently folded on August 22, 1878, due to financial difficulties compounded by a questionable game lost by the Tecumsehs and the International Association floundered a few years later. Both were resurrected in 1888 and 1889.

Among its more notable stars in 1888 was outfielder Patsy Donovan who went on to an outstanding career in Major League Baseball as both a player and a manager.

The Tecumsehs also played at the park pre- and post-1920, with Charlie (Mechanical Man) Gehringer playing with the 1921–1924 Tecumsehs before he went on to a stellar career with the Detroit Tigers. Gehringer was subsequently inducted into the Baseball Hall of Fame in Cooperstown, New York.

American baseball historians Bill Weiss and Marshall Wright have placed the 1920 London Tecumsehs on the list of the Top 100 Minor League Baseball Teams of all-time—coming in at #52, with a record of 86 wins and 32 losses.

On September 15, 1920, with Ty Cobb in the lineup, the Detroit Tigers defeated the London Tecumsehs 5-4 before 3,000 people at Tecumseh Park in exhibition baseball. Reserved seating for the game was $1.

The 1920 Tecumsehs clinched the first-place pennant with 15 games to play and London led the Michigan-Ontario league in attendance, with an astonishing 100,686 people watching them play.

On May 9, 1921, under manager George (Mooney) Gibson, the Pittsburgh Pirates beat the London Tecumsehs 8-7 at Tecumseh Park before 3,500 people in an exhibition baseball game. Before the game, Gibson and his team were presented with a silver loving cup by the London Kiwanis Club. Gibson thrilled the locals by catching the opening inning with his 1909 World Series-winning battery mate Babe Adams and singling and scoring a run in his lone at-bat. London Mayor Syd Little entertained the team that evening at his home.

On September 14, 1921, the Tecumsehs won the Michigan-Ontario Baseball League championship, 1-0 over Bay City, Michigan, before 1,000 people at Tecumseh Park. London scored its lone run in the first inning when third baseman Doc Shay, playing his first game of the series because of illness, tripled and scores on a sacrifice fly. In three games of the series, London pitcher Frank Herbst of London allowed six hits and only one run in 33 innings. London advanced against Ludington, Michigan, champions of the Central League.

On September 28, 1921, London won the best-of-seven series against Ludington 4-3, taking Game 7 10-7 at Grand Rapids, Mich. The Tecumsehs were down 3-1 in the series. A few days later, London manager Buzz Wetzel was presented with a gold watch to commemorate the win. The normally reserved Wetzel spoke, saying, "I tried to do what was right and give you the best I had and I honestly believe that the fans here have a right to be proud of their baseball team."

On May 23, 1923, Washington's pitching ace Walter Johnson was in uniform but did not pitch as the Washington Senators defeated the Tecumsehs 13-9 in an exhibition baseball game at Tecumseh Park.

George (Mooney) Gibson

One of the early stars to emerge from Tecumseh Park was London West resident, George Gibson, a young bricklayer-homebuilder turned catcher who enjoyed a lengthy playing career with the Pittsburgh Pirates, winning the World Series in 1909 by beating Ty Cobb's Detroit Tigers. When he arrived back at the train station in his hometown on October 27, 1909, there were more than 5,000 cheering fans to greet him. London, at the time, had approximately 35,000 residents.

Gibson played in the Major Leagues until 1918, 12 years with the Pirates and two years with the New York Giants, appearing in 1,213 games.

Gibson first signed a pro contract in 1903 and joined the Pittsburgh Pirates two years later. He had a strong throwing arm and led National League catchers in fielding percentage several times. Known as a developer of young pitchers, Gibson later managed the Toronto Maple Leafs of the AAA International League in 1919, the Pirates (1920–1922, 1932–1934) and the Chicago Cubs (1925).

He was named Canada's baseball player of the half century and in 1958 was the first baseball player elected to the Canadian Sports Hall of Fame. He was subsequently inducted into the Canadian Baseball Hall of Fame & Museum in 1987 and was one of the inaugural 10 inductees into the London Sports Hall of Fame in 2001.

Thames River flood of 1883

Tecumseh Park was damaged by a flood of the Thames River on July 11, 1883 which destroyed the original grandstands, located near today's outfield foul ball lines. Originally, home plate was located in today's left-centre field. The new replacement grandstand (1883–1937) was built facing east toward downtown London, with home plate moved to approximately the same location as it is today.

Beginning in 1892 the park was used for amateur and professional bicycle races, attracting such international stars as Harley Davidson (the Canadian Wheelman, a late-19th century cycling magazine was started and published in London).

Baseball continued to be played there as well, with three more incarnations of the Tecumsehs in the International Association (1888–1889), the International League (1890), and the Canadian League (1898–circa 1915), with the London Alerts, also of the Canadian League, playing in 1897 and 1899. Meanwhile, in 1895 the park was the site of the first-ever motion picture display in London, organized by the London Bicycle Club.

The London Cockneys played in the Class D International League in 1908 and the Class C Canadian League in 1911, while another Tecumsehs club played in the Class C and Class B Leagues from 1912 to 1915. It was during this period that Earle Neale played baseball at Labatt Park before he started his career in the Big Leagues with the Cincinnati Reds in 1916, later becoming an award-winning and innovative football coach in American pro football.

The Tecumsehs played in the Class B Michigan–Ontario League from 1919 to 1924, and during the early 1920s, the team included future Major League second-base star Charlie Gehringer. Gehringer and the Tecumsehs defeated the Boston Red Sox in an exhibition game, also in 1921. A second London team, the Indians, played in the Michigan–Ontario League in 1925. The Tecumsehs also played in the Class D Ontario League in 1930.

In 1940 and 1941, the London Pirates played in the Pennsylvania–Ontario–New York League, more commonly known as the PONY League. It was during this period that lights were installed at Labatt Park to permit night baseball. The 1941 Pirates team included pitcher Russ Getsinger and future Major Leaguers such as Jim Jordan and Vic Barnhart. Vic's brother Bob Barnhart was also a teammate on the 1941 London Pirates. Vic's father Clyde Barnhart was a star with the Pittsburgh Pirates throughout the 1920s including the 1925 and 1927 World Series teams.

Negro leagues and other players

During the first half of the 20th century, Labatt Park (Tecumseh Park until December 31, 1936) was regularly visited by numerous barnstorming Negro teams from the U.S., plus a much-celebrated visit by legendary African-American pitcher Satchel Paige on June 30, 1954, when Paige was barnstorming with a baseball version of the Harlem Globetrotters. Paige pitched the last three innings of an exhibition game against another legendary barnstorming team—The House of David baseball team, who all sported beards and long hair and travelled with their own generator-powered lights (before Labatt Park installed lights in the 1940s), which featured noted baseball clown, Frank (Bobo) Nickerson.

As of October 1, 1923, The London Colored Stars, a Negro baseball team, had won 15 of 19 games and announced they "are looking for more engagements."

Additionally, numerous former players with the Negro leagues played in the Senior Intercounty Baseball League after the Negro leagues gradually folded after Jackie Robinson broke the "colour barrier" in 1947, including pitcher Ted Alexander of the Kansas City Monarchs and the Homestead Grays (1950-51 London Majors); Wilmer Fields (Brantford Red Sox); Jimmy Wilkes (retired jersey #5 for the Brantford Red Sox, later became a City league umpire after a decade with Brantford); Gentry (Geep) Jessup (Galt Terriers); Larry Cunningham (Galt Terriers, Hamilton Cardinals); Ed Steele (Galt) and Shanty Clifford (Galt and Brantford); Luther Clifford; Max Manning; Lester Lockett; Bob Thurman and Stanley Glenn (St. Thomas Elgins); all made numerous appearances at Labatt Park in the 1950s.

The late Wilmer (The Great) Fields is a former president of the Negro Leagues Baseball Association (NLBPA), while Stanley (Doc) Glenn is currently the president of the NLBPA.

Bryce's 1876 and 1877 Baseball Guides

This is the world's oldest baseball grounds still in existence. 

A treasure-trove of information about early Canadian/Ontario "baseball" surfaced in 2002 when Library and Archives Canada purchased (for $10,000 from an Ottawa, Ontario, bookseller) Bryce's Base Ball Guide 1876 and Bryce's Base Ball Guide 1877, two hand-coloured, 75-page booklets published by William Bryce of London, Ontario, which originally sold for a dime.

The two, four-inch (102 mm)  by seven-inch guides are considered to be the first significant publications on Canadian baseball.

Bryce, a Scottish-born bookseller, newsagent and sporting goods distributor in London, had a small stake in the Tecumsehs, considered by many to be the finest ball team in the entire Dominion of Canada.

During U.S. President George W. Bush's visit to the Library and Archives Canada building on November 30, 2004, he showed a special interest in these two early Canadian base ball books which were laid out for his perusal. See here

Tecumseh Park becomes Labatt Park

According to the 1926 Geodetic Survey of Canada (and the subsequent detailed maps printed in 1928), there was a structure situated near what is now the main entrance to the ballpark at 25 Wilson Avenue (at the time, the two entrances to the ballpark were off of Dundas Street—now Riverside Drive—including an art deco entranceway that was demolished in the early 1980s).

According to Mooney Gibson's nephew, George Lambourn, a noted baseball historian in his own right, the residence at 27 Wilson Avenue was the home of the park's cranky caretaker, Jakey Butts, which was destroyed by the Thames River flood of 1937.

This devastating flood damaged the park again, necessitating the construction of the park's third grandstand (1937–2001) and a new clubhouse, with the local Labatt Brewing Company donating $10,000 to renovate the park, as well as deeding the park itself to the City of London on December 31, 1936, with the written provisions that the park remain a public athletic park in perpetuity and that it be renamed "The John Labatt Memorial Athletic Park."

From a sociological-historical perspective, it could be argued that the name change from Tecumseh Park to Labatt Memorial Park highlights the dramatic shift from 19th-Century colonial Canada (where the Shawnee Chief Tecumseh was immortalized throughout Canada for aiding the British in the War of 1812) to more modern times where businesses such as the Labatt Brewing Company exercised considerable influence on the cultural fabric of the day.

At the end of August during the 1950s, Labatt Park annually hosted athletes from across the city's playgrounds competing in a variety of sports during a two- to three-day event, called the "Junior Olympiad." (A P.U.C. Playground Supervisor's Reunion was held on June 24, 2006, at the City-owned Thames Valley Golf Course.)

Frank Colman and Tom Burgess

Other London notables to graduate to the Major Leagues from Labatt Park during the 1940s are Tom (Tim) Burgess (1927–2008) and Frank Colman (1918–1983).

In 1936, Frank Colman started out at Labatt Park with the London Winery of the Senior Intercounty Baseball League, winning the Most Valuable Player award, batting title and Intercounty Baseball League championship. Colman was 25 when he broke into the major leagues as a right fielder with the Pittsburgh Pirates, playing with them from 1942 through 1946, before he moved to New York to play with the Yankees. He played with the Yankees in 1946 and 1947, where he roomed with Yankee catcher Yogi Berra. He finished his six-year major league career with 571 at-bats, 15 home runs and 106 RBIs.

Colman returned to London in 1954 after playing in the minor leagues and being the player/coach of the Toronto Maple Leafs of the AAA International League from 1951–1953. He bought the London Majors and, as player/ owner, won the Intercounty League title in 1956 and the Great Lakes championship in 1957 before returning to the Intercounty League in 1958 and selling the team in 1959.

Colman is also a co-founder of the Eager Beaver Baseball Association (EBBA) in London which has provided competitive league play for thousands of youngsters since its founding in 1955. In 1984, a year after Colman's death, the EBBA's all-star day in mid-July was renamed "Frank Colman Day."

Colman was inducted into the Canadian Baseball Hall of Fame & Museum in 1999 and the London Sports Hall of Fame in 2005.

In a letter to the Canadian Baseball Hall of Fame in 1999, Yogi Berra wrote that he visited Colman at his home in Canada on several occasions.

"I've made a lot of friends in baseball through the years, but I'll always remember Frank as one of the most decent and genuine people that I ever met", Berra wrote. "I was proud that he was my friend."

Tom Burgess first signed a pro contract with St. Louis in 1946 and played right field and first base for the St. Louis Cardinals from 1954 to 1961 and right field and first base for the Los Angeles Angels from 1962–1963.

"[Former P.U.C. recreation director] Bill Farquharson gave me the opportunity from the playground days and I worked my way up to the big leagues where I made a living for 44 years."—Tom (Tim) Burgess, November 28, 2005 

Since 1968, Burgess has been involved in Major League Baseball in a variety of managing, coaching and instructor capacities with several organizations, including the St. Louis Cardinals from 1968 to 1975, the New York Mets from 1976 to 1977, the Texas Rangers from 1980 to 1984, the Detroit Tigers from 1985 to 1987, the Kansas City Royals from 1987 to 1995. From 1996 to the present day, Burgess has been an instructor with both Baseball Canada and the Ontario Baseball Association. He was inducted into the Canadian Baseball Hall of Fame & Museum in 1992 and the London Sports Hall of Fame in 2003.

London Supremes and London Army Team

During World War II (1942 onward), the park was the home field for several women's baseball, softball and fastball teams, including the London Supremes who played in the Michigan–Ontario Women's Fastball League into the 1950s. In 1943 and 1944, the London Army Team won the Canadian Sandlot title.

Shortly after World War II Labatt Park was the home of the London Majors, which won the Canadian Sandlot Congress in 1947 and the Can-Am Baseball Congress championship in 1948, beating the Fort Wayne, Indiana, General Electrics in a best-of-seven-game series at Labatt Park, as well as winning the Canadian, Ontario and Intercounty titles.

Denny McLain and Fergie Jenkins

In 1974, after Cy Young Award-winning pitcher Denny McLain had retired from the major leagues (two years earlier), McLain played a season for the London Majors, restricting himself to home games at Labatt Park. Due to arm problems, however, McLain only pitched nine innings for the Majors, but did play in 14 games at either shortstop, first base and catcher and batted .380, including hitting two homers in one game in London.

After Cy Young Award-winning pitcher Fergie Jenkins pitched his final major league game on September 26, 1983, London Majors' owner-player Arden Eddie convinced Jenkins to pitch for the Majors in 1984-85, commuting from his home near Chatham, Ontario. The Canadian-born Jenkins is one of the few MLB players to have been inducted into both the Baseball Hall of Fame & Museum in Cooperstown, New York and the Canadian Baseball Hall of Fame & Museum in St. Marys, Ontario, Canada.

Tigers, Werewolves and Monarchs

Professional baseball declined in London after the war, with mostly amateur teams playing at Labatt Park in the following decades, until 1989 when an AA Eastern League affiliate of the Detroit Tigers was established by investors/ Board of Directors, President Dan Ross, Vice President Mike Tucker, Vice President and General Manager Bob Gilson, Vice President and Assistant General Manager General Manager Bill Wilkinson and Vice President Brian Costello.

Immediately prior to the London Tigers' inaugural season at Labatt Park in 1989, numerous improvements were completed at the park costing approximately $1-million for new lights, new dressing rooms and dugouts, additional seating, field and entrance upgrades, food concession enhancements and a new -by-19-foot electronic scoreboard (partially sponsored by Labatt Breweries). Previously, the scoreboard was changed manually. In 1990, Labatt Park and its head groundskeeper Mike Regan, won the prestigious "Beam Clay Award" as the best natural-grass field in North America.

Broadcasting the Tigers' games on TV London with veteran local sportscaster Pete James were former Tiger greats Mickey Lolich and later, Denny McLain.

The 1990 London Tigers won the Eastern League title under manager Chris Chambliss (one of the Tigers' players was Travis Fryman), but the Tom Runnells-managed Tigers relocated to Trenton, New Jersey after the 1993 season, citing declining attendance.

On January 20, 1990, In Houston, Texas, Labatt Park was named the "Beam Clay Baseball Diamond of the Year" for "excellence and professionalism in maintaining an outstanding professional baseball diamond"—due to the outstanding groundskeeping work of City of London employee/supervisor, Mike Regan and his assistant Rob Garrett.

The park was considered for the filming of the 1992 movie A League of Their Own starring Madonna and Geena Davis, but filming could not fit around the home schedule of the Double A London Tigers of the Eastern League.

The London Werewolves of the fledgling Frontier League played at the park from 1999 to 2001, winning the Frontier League championship in 1999; Werewolves pitcher Brett Gray tossed 25 strikeouts on June 3, 2000 (home opener), against the Chillicothe (Ohio) Paints. The game's scorecard and Brett Gray's jersey were donated to the Canadian Baseball Hall of Fame & Museum in St. Marys, Ontario, by Werewolves' General Manager John Kuhn.

In 2000, former MLB star Ron LeFlore was hired as the manager of the Cook County Cheetahs of the Frontier League, visiting Labatt Park several times during the season.

In 2001 after the circa-1937 main grandstand was demolished and a new, $1.97-million, wheelchair-accessible main grandstand was built (the park's fourth) and a new "pop-up" underground irrigation system was installed, the park was used as the chief baseball venue for the Canada Summer Games.

In 2003 the park was also home to the London Monarchs of the short-lived Canadian Baseball League, which folded mid-season due to financial difficulties. The team's manager was former Major Leaguer Willie Wilson and featured such stars as first-baseman Francisco Cabrera and pitcher Amaury Telemaco. The league's inaugural game and home opener for the London Monarchs was held at Labatt Park on May 21, 2003, and was televised nationally on The Score. It also featured a fly-over by the Canadian Snowbirds flying team. League Commissioner Fergie Jenkins was also in attendance.

Beehive of activity

Along with bicycle racing, Labatt Park has in the past been used for soccer, fastball, softball, high-school and men's football, track and field, wrestling, boxing, winter skating, political rallies, showjumping, civic receptions, the Royal Canadian Mounted Police (RCMP) Musical Ride and a 21-gun salute to Her Majesty Queen Elizabeth II during her visit to London's Victoria Park on June 26, 1997.

Currently, the park is home to the London Majors of the Intercounty League and the London Badgers junior team, as well as several other youth and adult baseball teams. The UWO Mustangs Baseball Club managed by former London Majors/AA London Tigers/AAA Toledo Mud Hens pitcher Mike Lumley is using the park during the 2006 Ontario University Athletics (OUA) baseball season (in 2005, the Mustangs won the OUA baseball title at Labatt Park for the first time, beating Brock University) Badgers in the final best-of-three championship series. The Western Mustangs repeated as OUA champs in 2006, beating Brock two games to nothing (7-4, 5-0) at Labatt Park on October 21.

It should also be noted that Ted Giannoulas, aka "The Famous Chicken" sports mascot, was born and raised in London, Ontario, and during the years 1965 to 1967 worked part-time at Labatt Park during baseball games changing the old manual scoreboard in right field for 25 cents a game.

Roy McKay Clubhouse, home to the London Majors

In 1996, the "Reasons for Designation" for the park under the Ontario Heritage Act were amended to include the circa-1937, tongue-and-groove clapboard clubhouse of the London Majors, renamed the "Roy McKay Clubhouse" on August 1, 1996 (McKay was born on August 1), by Majors' longtime player/owner Arden Eddie in honour of former pitcher, manager and coach Roy McKay who died on Christmas Day in 1995, six months after falling on the porch of his Waterloo Street home. Subsequently, a large commemorative rock and bronze plaque honouring Roy McKay, jersey #16, was installed at the front of the clubhouse.

See a photo of the Roy McKay Clubhouse here.

"I would like to be remembered for being a devoted son and brother, a loving husband, a great father and a damn good friend."—Roy McKay, 1933–1995 

To help raise money for a new cedar-shingle roof on the historic clubhouse, a ballgame dubbed "The Rumble at the Riverforks" was played at the park on May 31, 1998, featuring members of London city council, members of the local media and the London Majors' oldtimers. The game was organized by The Friends of Labatt Park, SCENE magazine and the London Majors.

On June 18, 2005, veteran Intercounty Baseball League umpire Joe Serratore was married to bride Bren Ferguson at home plate before 200 friends and family members, with United Church minister Reverend Susan Eagle (who, at the time, was a member of London city council) officiating. The home-plate wedding ceremony is believed to be a first for the ballpark.

Labatt Park Reunion, 2005

On Saturday, July 23, 2005, the City of London in conjunction with the London Sports Council, the London Sports Oldtimers Association, the London Majors Baseball Club and The Friends of Labatt Park, organized a special, day-long event at the park to commemorate the city's 150th anniversary as an incorporated municipality (more than 10,000 residents) and the park's 128-year-old history. The event featured an open baseball clinic for youngsters run by the London Majors, vintage ball games, displays of park/ baseball memorabilia and a Majors' oldtimers' reunion.

In 2006, London photo-historian Stephen Harding spent two days photographing the interior and exterior of the Roy McKay Clubhouse and presented his photos/ report to the City's heritage planner as City staff formulate plans to make additional repairs to the 70-year-old structure.

Got Milk? commercials spoof MLB steroid use

In late September 2005, the San Francisco advertising firm of Goodby, Silverstein & Partners filmed a series of five, 30-second Got Milk? TV-commercials at Labatt Park, that subsequently ran during post-season play of Major League Baseball (MLB), starting on October 11. The commercials, which spoofed the ongoing steroid scandal in MLB had players "caught" using a "performance-enhancing substance"—milk. The commercials were titled "Caught", "Batting Practice", "Tabloid", "Never Poured" and "Manager."  The commercial "Never Poured" was shortlisted at the 2006 Cannes Film Festival. From the get-go, MLB demanded that the commercials be taken off the air, but the popular commercials were subsequently re-released in December 2007 and ran through January 2008.

The humorous commercials continued to run during the 2005 World Series, won in 4 straight games by Chicago. An on-line poll on a Houston, Texas-based Web site revealed that 75% of more than 23,000 poll respondents found the commercials to be funny and wanted them left on the air.

Roadway Express's 2006–2007 baseball calendar

Labatt Park is one of three featured baseball parks in the 16-month (September 2006 to December 2007) Roadway Express baseball calendar; Labatt Park is featured in the month of October 2007 "Times of Greatness" baseball calendar published by Roadway Express, based in Akron, Ohio. The print run of the calendars is 150,000.

Roadway Express is also the sponsor of the "Times of Greatness" interactive, -long museum travelling coast to coast in the U.S. and Canada every year, showcasing Negro leagues history and artifacts. Roadway Express is also a sponsor of the Negro Leagues Baseball Museum in Kansas City, Missouri.

Bob Paige, a longtime driver for Roadway Express, is the son of Hall-of-Fame pitcher, Satchel Paige, who made a much-publicized visit to Labatt Park on June 30, 1954.

Baseball Day in London, 2006

 
On July 1 (Canada Day), 2006, London held its second annual Baseball Day, organized by the City of London, The Friends of Labatt Park, Fanshawe Pioneer Village, the London Majors Baseball Club, the London Oldtimers' Sports Association, the London and District Baseball Association and the London Sports Council.

The day featured an open, drop-in baseball clinic with the London Majors, historical displays in the Roy McKay Clubhouse, a 1923 Wurlitzer Military Band Organ (restored and owned and operated by Ken Vinen of Aylmer, Ontario), a vintage base ball game between Fanshawe Pioneer Village's London Tecumsehs and Bruce Huff's Thames River Ratz (the Ratz won 15-3), a pitch, hit and run competition and a doubleheader between the London Majors and the Toronto Maple Leafs of the Intercounty Baseball League (London won both games, 9-1 and 3-2). The scheduled fireworks (courtesy of the City of London) after the game over the adjacent river forks were cancelled due to high winds. Instead, they were set off the following night on July 2.

See also

 Rickwood Field in Birmingham, Alabama, the oldest professional baseball park in the United States

External links
 Labatt Park Policies & Procedures: A User Guide for the World's Oldest Baseball Park
 London Heritage Council – Labatt Park
 Digital Ballparks tour of Labatt Park

References

 The Northern Game: Baseball the Canadian Way by Bob Elliott (Sport Classic, 2005).
 Heritage Baseball: City of London a souvenir program from July 23, 2005, celebrating the history of Labatt Park and London, Ontario's 150th anniversary as an incorporated city.
 Pitcher has Paige in London's history by James Reaney, The London Free Press, Sunday, May 2, 2004, page T-7.
 Monarchs draft former Atlanta Brave by Ryan Pyette, The London Free Press, April 16, 2003.
 Boys of Summer: Knute, Boot, Milky and Buck by Don Maudsley, (SCENE magazine, London, Ontario, June 15, 2000).
 The magic continues at London's Field of Dreams by Barry Wells (SCENE magazine, London, Ontario, June 15, 2000).
 Who's Who in Canadian Sport by Bob Ferguson (Sporting Facts Publications, Ottawa, 3rd edition, 1999), .
 Intercounty Major Baseball League's 1998 Record Book by Editor Herb Morell and Dominico Promotions Inc.
 London Majors Baseball Club, 1998 Souvenir Program.
 Jackie Robinson, A Biography by Arnold Rampersad (Alfred E. Knopf Inc., New York, 1997), . (page 113)
 Diamonds of the North: A Concise History of Baseball in Canada by William Humber (Oxford University Press, 1995), .
 The Beaver, Exploring Canada's History, Baseball's Canadian Roots: Abner Who? by Mark Kearney October–November 1994.
 EBBA: 40 Years of Baseball by Jeffrey Reed (Eager Beaver Baseball Association, Inc., London, Ontario, 1994), .
 The 1948 London Majors: A Great Canadian Team by Dan Mendham (unpublished academic paper, UWO, December 7, 1992).
 London Tigers 1989, The Collector's Edition, Souvenir Program.
  Tiger Special: Peanuts, popcorn, crackerjack, Baseball's Back, The London Free Press, Section F, April 7, 1989.
 Diamond Rituals: Baseball in Canadian Culture by Robert K. Barney (Meckler Books, 1989).
 Journal of Sport History, A Critical Examination of a Source in Early Ontario Baseball: The Reminiscence of Adam E. Ford by UWO Professor Robert K. Barney and Nancy Bouchier (Vol. 15, No. 1, Spring 1988).
 Cheering for the Home Team: The Story of Baseball in Canada by William Humber (The Boston Mills Press, 1983), .
 Nobody's Perfect by Denny McLain with Dave Diles (The Dial Press, New York, 1975).
 Looking Over Western Ontario: Three Tecumsehs made all-star baseball team in 1872 by Les Bronson, The London Free Press, June 17, 1972.
 Old Time Baseball and the London Tecumsehs of the late 1870s by Les Bronson, a recorded (and later transcribed) talk given to the London & Middlesex Historical Society on February 15, 1972. Available in the London Room of the Central Branch of the London Public Library.
 Bill Stern's Favorite Baseball Stories by Bill Stern, (Blue Ribbon Books, Garden City, New York, 1949).
 Mohawks Split Games Over The Week-End: Bill Horton Master Over St. Clair Nine in Saturday's Tilt, The London Free Press, July 16, 1939.
 An Eight-Page Indenture/ Instrument #33043 between The London and Western Trusts Company Limited, The Corporation of The City of London and John Labatt, Limited, dated December 31, 1936, and registered on title in the Land Registry Office for the City of London on January 2, 1937, conveying Tecumseh Park to the City of London along with $10,000 on the provisos that the athletic field be preserved, maintained and operated in perpetuity "for the use of the citizens of the City of London as an athletic field and recreation ground" and that it be renamed "The John Labatt Memorial Athletic Park."

1877 establishments in Ontario
Sports venues in London, Ontario
Baseball venues in Ontario
Minor league baseball venues
Companies based in London, Ontario
Designated heritage properties in Ontario
Sports venues completed in 1877